Paul Stănescu (born 25 August 1957) is a Romanian politician. He served as the Deputy Prime Minister and Minister of Regional Development from 17 October 2017 to 4 November 2019.

In 1978, Stănescu entered the agronomy faculty of the University of Craiova, graduating in 1982. From that year until 1987, he headed the canning factory in Caracal. From 1988 to 1991, he directed the state agricultural enterprise in Studina village. From 1992 to 2008, Stănescu managed an agricultural firm in Vișina village. From 2008 to 2016, he was president of the Olt County Council. In 2016, he was elected to the Romanian Senate.

References 

Social Democratic Party (Romania) politicians
Romanian Ministers of Regional Development
Deputy Prime Ministers of Romania
Members of the Senate of Romania
Councillors in Romania
University of Craiova alumni
Romanian agronomists
21st-century Romanian politicians
Living people
1957 births